Nicotera is a comune (municipality) in the province of Vibo Valentia, Calabria, southern Italy.

History

The origins of Nicòtera lie with the ancient Greek city of Medma, which was founded by the Locresis of Locri Epizephyris.

During the period of Roman domination it survived only in the form of the emporium (port), near today's Nicotera Marina. A Christian bishopric see is attested in Nicotera during the Middle Ages. 

 
In 1065 Robert Guiscard – enlarging his Principate of Salerno – seized it from the Byzantine Empire, and the town grew around the castle and the cathedral built under the Normans. In 1122, Nicotera was attacked by an Almoravid fleet: some of the populace were killed while the rest were taken and sold into slavery.

Under Holy Roman Emperor Frederick II Nicotera attained economic wealth. To encourage commerce and industry, Frederick promoted Jewish settlement in the area called "Giudecca", a ghetto area near the castle, in which Jews lived under the protection of the Bishop of Nicotera, and enjoyed protection from Christian persecution.

In the 15th century, under the rule of Alfonso of Aragon, the town came under the yoke of feudalism and fell into decay. In 1806 the French Revolution swept away the feudal system in Nicotera.  After the restoration of Ferdinand I of the Two Sicilies, Nicotera continued to be chief town of the district, with what are now the modern communes of Joppolo and Limbadi as its dependencies.

Notes

External links

Cities and towns in Calabria